National Awakening – People's Movement (ÞPM) was a social-democratic political party in Iceland. The party was founded around Jóhanna Sigurðardóttir, future Prime Minister of Iceland.

History
The party was formed in 1994 in preparation for the 1995 parliamentary election; one of the co-founders was Jóhanna Sigurðardóttir after she lost an internal election for the leadership of the Social Democratic Party. She was joined by members of the People's Alliance. In the 1995 parliamentary elections the party won 7.2% of the vote and four seats.

On 2 October 1996 its members of parliament joined the Social Democratic Party to form a unified parliamentary group. For the 1999 parliamentary elections it formed the United Front electoral alliance with the Social Democratic Party and the People's Alliance and the Women's List, winning 30% of the vote and 20 seats. In 2000 the parties merged with to form the Social Democratic Alliance.

Electoral results

References

Defunct political parties in Iceland
Social democratic parties
Political parties established in 1994
Political parties disestablished in 1998
1994 establishments in Iceland
Social Democratic Alliance